Garen is an abandoned townsite in Washington County, Minnesota.

History 
Garen was a town just south of Forest Lake, Minnesota. It was located on present U.S. Route 61 and 190th Street. Garen South School in District No. 72 opened in 1893. It had 5 grades: A, B, C, D, and E. The school eventually burned to the ground.

A former Forest Lake historian recalls: "A labor of love that impressed me was to learn about the thoughtfulness of the mothers on cold, winter days. They took turns bringing a hot dish, soup, home baked beans or scalloped potatoes to add to cold lunches the children brought from home in their lunch pails. There also was an oil stove for cooking. Sometimes they had hot chocolate to drink, which at times was a little scorched."

Further reading
 Elsie Vogel, The Forest Lake Times; Oct 31, 1991

Former populated places in Minnesota
Former populated places in Washington County, Minnesota